Bebearia equatorialis, the equatorial forester, is a butterfly in the family Nymphalidae. It is found in the north-western part of the Democratic Republic of the Congo. The habitat consists of forests.

References

Butterflies described in 1989
equatorialis
Endemic fauna of the Democratic Republic of the Congo
Butterflies of Africa